An academy school is type of school in the English education system.

Academy School may also refer to:
 The Academy School, a prep school in Hampstead, London
 Academy School, Glastonbury, Connecticut, United States, a former school

See also